Susendal Church is a parish church of the Church of Norway in Hattfjelldal Municipality in Nordland county, Norway. It is located in the village of Svenskvollen in the Susendal valley. It is one of the churches for the Hattfjelldal parish which is part of the Indre Helgeland prosti (deanery) in the Diocese of Sør-Hålogaland. The brown, wooden church was built in a long church style in 2001 using plans drawn up by the architect Jim Inge Bøasæter. The church seats about 150 people.

History

A chapel was built at Svenskvollen in the Susendal valley in 1916. That red chapel seated about 70 people. In 1998 when the Bishop visited the chapel, it was decided that the church was in poor condition and a new church should be built to replace it. In 2001, a new church was built right next door. The new wooden church seats about 150 people. It was consecrated on 14 October 2001 by the Bishop Øystein Ingar Larsen.

See also
List of churches in Sør-Hålogaland

References

Hattfjelldal
Churches in Nordland
Wooden churches in Norway
21st-century Church of Norway church buildings
Churches completed in 2001
2001 establishments in Norway
Long churches in Norway